"Atom Bomb" is a single by the English electronic music band Fluke, released on 28 October 1996 at Circa and in 1997 at Caroline Records. Originally created for the soundtrack to the video game Wipeout 2097 and later featured in Gran Turismo, the track reached #20 in the UK music charts and brought Fluke their first non-club mainstream single. This song is also featured in part in other productions, including the films The Saint, Kiss the Girls, X-Men and Behind Enemy Lines, the theatrical trailers for Paparazzi and The Bourne Ultimatum, and the video game Enter the Matrix.

It was included on the album Risotto in 1997. The packaging and discs were designed by The Designers Republic in their typical futurist style, with the character designed and illustrated by David J. Aldred. All of Fluke's subsequent releases from this single were also designed by the firm, as were the first three games of the Wipeout series.

The part-animated music video was directed by Shaun Magher, who also directed and supervised the animation.

Versions

External links

References

Fluke (band) songs
1996 songs